Jackie Craven is an American poet and author with a broad background in arts and the humanities.

Career 
She's the author of Secret Formulas & Techniques of the Masters (Brick Road Poetry Press, 2018)  and a chapbook of fabulist tales, Our Lives Became Unmanageable (Omnidawn, 2016), which won the Omnidawn Fabulist Fiction award.  Her publications also include two books on home décor, articles on architecture and design, travel essays, poetry, fiction, and literary commentary.

She writes about literature, art, architecture, design, and other topics for ThoughtCo, an online resource that evolved from About.com, where Craven worked for many years. Craven's literary writing has been published in various journals, including AGNI (magazine), Mid-American Review, New Ohio Review, River Styx (magazine), Existere, The Fourth River, SNReview, Pearl (literary magazine), Pleiades (journal), and The Asheville Poetry Review. She is a member of the North American Travel Journalists Association (NATJA), and her travel features have been published in major newspapers in the United States and Canada. She wrote a monthly column for House & Garden magazine, and published many features in The Providence Journal and other newspapers. Previously, she worked as an architecture writer for Realtor magazine.

She holds a Doctor of Arts in English from the State University of New York at Albany. Craven lives in Schenectady, New York and Cocoa Beach, Florida.

Selected works

Chapbooks
Our Lives Became Unmanageable. Omnidawn Publishing (2016)

Books
Secret Formulas & Techniques of the Masters. Brick Road Poetry Press (2018)
The Stress-Free Home: Beautiful Interiors for Serenity and Harmonious Living. Rockport Publishers / Quarry Books (2003)
The Healthy Home: Beautiful Interiors That Enhance the Environment and Your Well-Being. Rockport Publishers / Quarry Books (2003)
The Healthy Home Korean Translation. (2008) 
The Healthy Home German Translation. (2008)

References

External links
 Personal website
 Authory website
 Distant Dwellings site

American architecture writers
American travel writers
American poets
Writers from New York (state)
Year of birth missing (living people)
Living people
American women poets
American women travel writers
21st-century American women